Velența is a quarter, or district, in eastern Oradea, Romania. The quarter is crossed by the E60 European Road, and has retained many of its old buildings, escaping the massive Communist urbanisation programme.

History

Its name Velence means Venice in Hungarian, as this settlement served as the home for the Venetian builders who worked on the expansion of the Fortress. It was legally considered a separate town until 1872, when it merged with Orașu Nou, Olosig and Subcetate to form Nagyvárad (Oradea-Mare). 

Oradea